Ernest William Taylor (10 June 1898 – 23 November 1980) was an Australian rules footballer who played in the VFL between 1920 and 1926 for the Richmond Football Club.

Family
The son of the former Richmond (VFA) captain, Charles Henry Taylor (1872-1951), and Annie Ethel Maud Taylor (1877–1938), née Mitchell, Ernest William Taylor was born at Richmond, Victoria on 10 June 1898.

He married Amelia Jane Comans (1896-1927) in 1920. He married his second wife, Mary Evelyn "Mae" Grace (1908-1991), in 1932.

Football

A back-pocket and half-back flanker, he was recruited from the Burnley Football Club, and made his senior debut with Richmond against South Melbourne, at the Lake Oval, on 14 August 1920.

In his fifth First XVIII match he played in the back pocket for Richmond in its 1920 Grand Final win over Collingwood, 7.10 (52) to 5.5 (35). In his seventeenth match he played in the back-pocket for Richmond in its 1921 Grand Final win over Carlton, 5.6 (36) to 4.8 (32).

In what was thought, at the time, to be his last game for Richmond, he played in the back-pocket for Richmond against South Melbourne, at Windy Hill, on 13 September 1924 as part of the VFL's one-year-only experiment with a "round-robin tournament" in place of the regular "Argus system". He was badly injured during the last quarter of the match, and was in hospital for a number of weeks. South Melbourne's Bill Condon was charged with elbowing Taylor; however, due to the severity of Taylor's injury (fractured skull and two facial fractures), the hearings were controversially suspended for a considerable time, with, eventually, the case being dismissed on the grounds of the considerable delay raising doubts about the reliability of the participants' recall of the events in question.

After retiring as a player Taylor served on the Richmond Football Club Committee between 1925 and 1936, and then later in 1941 and 1942, being elected Vice President in 1935 and 1936.

Although he had declared his retirement, following his 1924 injuries, at the beginning of the 1925 season, he went on to play another four senior games  two in 1925, and two in 1926  to help Richmond out when it was short of players.

Death
He died at Camberwell, Victoria on 23 November 1980.

Notes

References
 Hogan P: The Tigers of Old: A complete History of Every Player to Represent the Richmond Football Club between 1908 and 1996, Richmond FC, (Melbourne), 1996.

External links
 
 

1898 births
1980 deaths
Australian rules footballers from Melbourne
Australian Rules footballers: place kick exponents
Richmond Football Club players
Richmond Football Club Premiership players
Two-time VFL/AFL Premiership players
People from Richmond, Victoria